A person's romantic orientation, also called affectional orientation, is the classification of the sex or gender with which a person experiences romantic attraction towards or is likely to have a romantic relationship with. The term is used alongside the term "sexual orientation", as well as being used alternatively to it, based upon the perspective that sexual attraction is only a single component of a larger concept.

For example, although a pansexual person may feel sexually attracted to people regardless of gender, the person may experience romantic attraction and intimacy with women only.

For asexual people, romantic orientation is often considered a more useful measure of attraction than sexual orientation.

The relationship between sexual attraction and romantic attraction is still under debate. Sexual and romantic attractions are often studied in conjunction. Even though studies of sexual and romantic spectrums are shedding light onto this under-researched subject, much is still not fully understood.

Romantic identities

People may or may not engage in purely emotional romantic relationships. The main identities relating to this are:
 Aromantic, meaning someone who experiences little to no romantic attraction. 
 , or experiencing romantic attraction rarely, only under certain circumstances, or only weakly
 : Romantic attraction towards any of the above but only after forming a deep emotional bond with the person(s) (demiromanticism).
 : Romantic attraction towards person(s) of the opposite gender (heteroromanticism).
 : Romantic attraction towards person(s) of the same gender (homoromanticism).
 : Romantic attraction towards two or more genders, or person(s) of the same and other genders (biromanticism). Sometimes used the same way as panromantic.
 : Romantic attraction towards person(s) of any, every, and all genders (panromanticism).
 : Romantic attraction towards person(s) of various, but not all, genders (polyromanticism).

Relationship with sexual orientation and asexuality
The implications of the distinction between romantic and sexual orientations have not been fully recognized, nor have they been studied extensively. It is common for sources to describe sexual orientation as including components of both sexual and romantic (or romantic equivalent) attractions. Publications investigating the relationship between sexual orientation and romantic orientation are limited. Challenges in collecting information result from survey participants having difficulty identifying or distinguishing between sexual and romantic attractions. Asexual individuals experience little to no sexual attraction (see gray asexuality); however, they may still experience romantic attraction. Lisa M. Diamond states that a person's romantic orientation can differ from whom the person is sexually attracted to. While there is limited research on the discordance between sexual attraction and romantic attraction in individuals, the possibility of fluidity and diversity in attractions have been progressively recognized. Researchers Bulmer and Izuma found that people who identify as aromantic often have more negative attitudes in relation to romance. While roughly 1% of the population identifies as asexual, 74% of those people reported having some form of romantic attraction.

The first recorded conceptualization of orientation that took into account split attraction was in 1879 by Karl Heinrich Ulrichs, a German writer who published 12 books on non-heterosexual attraction. In these books, Ulrichs has presented several classifications that are quite similar to modern LGBT identities. Among his works, he described people who are “konjunktiver Uranodioning” and “disjunktiver Uranodioning” or conjunctive bisexuality and disjunctive bisexuality. The former is described as having tender and passionate feelings for both men and women, which would be a biromantic bisexual in modern times. The second is one who has tender feelings for people of the same gender/sex, but 'in love' feelings for people of a different gender/sex, which would now be a heteroromantic homosexual. However, the Ulrichs model never became popular due to the complexity.

An example of the separation of sexual and romantic attractions was in 1979 by psychologist Dorothy Tennov, with the publication of her book Love and Limerence – the Experience of Being in Love. In the book, Tennov described limerence as a form of attraction that could be described as a crush on someone. Although Tennov saw sex as part of limerence, she recognized that it was not its main focus. The term "non-limerent" is sometimes considered the precursor of aromantic.

Aromanticism

Aromanticism is a romantic orientation characterized by experiencing little to no romantic attraction. The term "aromantic", colloquially shortened to "aro", refers to a person who identifies their romantic orientation as aromanticism. The opposite of aromanticism is alloromanticism, defined as a romantic orientation in which one experiences romantic love or romantic attraction to others. However, despite aromanticism and alloromanticism considered antonymous by some, some individuals who fall on the aromantic spectrum of identities describe themselves as having experienced romantic love or romantic attraction at some point. Such aromantics may adopt labels for more specific identities on the aromantic spectrum, such as "grayromantic" (romantic attraction rarely experienced or only weakly experienced) or "demiromantic" (only experiencing romantic attraction after a strong emotional bond has been formed with the target). As the experience of romantic attraction is subjective, some aromantic people may find it difficult to determine whether they experience romantic attraction. As such, those who are aromantic may have trouble distinguishing platonic affection from romantic affection.

Although some aromantic people may choose to enter a romantic relationship, they are less likely than alloromantic individuals to do so. Aromantic people can also form non-romantic relationships of all types, as well as being able to enjoy sexual relationships. They may also choose to have children, and studies indicate that aromantic individuals are no less likely to have children than alloromantic individuals. This is because aromanticism is independent of sexuality or libido, and despite many aromantic people also being asexual, many are also allosexual. Due to this, aromantic people who are not asexual can also identify with other sexual orientations, such as "aromantic bisexual" or "aromantic heterosexual". Aromantic asexual people are colloquially known as "aro-ace" or "aroace". Aromantic individuals are also able to experience platonic love and have committed friendships, and some form intimate non-romantic partnerships called "queerplatonic relationships".

In the expanded LGBT initialism, aromanticism is sometimes included, most commonly in the term LGBTQIA+, where the letter "A" represents aromanticism, in addition to asexuality and agender. The aromantic pride flag includes five stripes of dark green, light green, white, gray, and black. Some have argued that aromanticism is under-represented, under-researched, or frequently misunderstood. In society at large, aromantic people are often stigmatized and stereotyped as being afraid of intimacy, heartless, or deluded. Amatonormativity, a concept that elevated romantic relationship over non-romantic ones, has been said to be damaging to aromantics. Aromanticism is rarely depicted in media, and there are very few fictional aromantic characters.

See also 
 Bromance
 Cross-sex friendship
 Emotional affair
 Heterosociality
 Homosociality
 Queerplatonic relationship
 Romantic friendship
 Womance

References

Further reading

Sexual orientation
Romance
Asexuality
LGBT